The ZALA Lancet (official designation: Item 52/Item 51) is an unmanned aerial vehicle (UAV) and loitering munition developed by Russian company ZALA Aero Group (part of Kalashnikov Concern) for the Russian Armed Forces. It was first unveiled in June 2019 at the ARMY-2019 military expo in Moscow. It is a further development of the ZALA KYB-UAV (also known as KUB-BLA) loitering munition.

Description

The ZALA Lancet can be used for both reconnaissance and strike missions. In combat mode, it can be armed either with high explosive (HE) or HE-fragmentation warheads. It features optical-electronic guidance and TV guidance unit, which allows the munition to be controlled during the terminal stage of flight. The drone features intelligence, navigation and communications modules. According to Zala Aero Chief Designer Alexander Zakharov, the Lancet can be used in so called "air mining" role. Lancet can be launched via catapult launcher from ground or sea platforms like the Raptor-class patrol boats. The drone is powered by an electric motor.

Operational history
The Lancet has been combat tested in Syria during the Russian military intervention in the Syrian civil war since at least November 2020. In April 2021, it was engaged in strikes against Tahrir al-Sham in the Idlib Governorate.

On 8 June 2022, Russian defence corporation Rostec announced that Lancet and KUB drones were deployed during the 2022 Russian invasion of Ukraine. A month later, the first video of their combat use in Ukraine emerged. In late 2022, multiple videos appeared on social networks showing Lancet drones striking a variety of Ukrainian military targets, such as air defence systems, self-propelled howitzers, tanks and military trucks. Among the targets damaged or destroyed were S-300 missile systems, a Buk-M1 missile system, a T-64 tank, Western-supplied M777 and FH70 howitzers, as well as M109, AHS Krab,  and CAESAR self-propelled howitzers. On 4 November 2022, a Gyurza-M-class gunboat of the Ukrainian Navy was damaged by a Lancet drone, the first time a Lancet attacked a naval target during the war.

In February 2023, a Lancet drone targetted and damaged a rare Ukrainian T-84 tank. In March 2023, a British-supplied Stormer HVM air-defence system was struck by a Lancet drone for the first time.

While long-range Iranian Shahed-136 kamikaze drones are used against Ukrainian energy infrastructure, the Lancet is employed as a precision battlefield weapon against high-value military targets, usually located by a reconnaissance drone before it gets launched. Although the Lancet is recorded having hit a number of Ukrainian targets, there are also numerous misses. Even if it hits it does not guarantee a kill, sometimes causing minor damage that can be repaired. Russia may be prevented from producing Lancets in large numbers due to international sanctions, as Russian drones are dependent on imported electronics and they are having difficulties in finding alternatives.

According to Oryx, Dutch open-source intelligence website, Lancet drones scored more than 100 successful hits on Ukrainian targets during the war. Most of the targets were towed artillery and self-propeled artillery systems.

Variants
Lancet-4
Entered service with limited number of units in March 2023. Lancet V4 is essentially an improved V3 drone with a significantly larger explosive warhead, more agility and speed, and improved jamming protection.
Lancet-3
Basic and bigger variant with a 40-minute endurance.
Lancet-1
 A smaller version of the Lancet-3. It carries a  payload and has a  MTOW. The endurance is 30 minutes.

Russian troops in Ukraine have begun using the upgraded Lancet loitering munitions with an increased flight duration of one hour and a more powerful warhead weighing more than five kilograms, which is at least two kilograms more than the basic version of the drone. Lancets are used to attack personnel with a high explosive fragmentation or thermobaric warhead, and armored vehicles with a high-explosive anti-tank (HEAT) warhead. The upgraded variant is designated Izdeliye 51, while the original one, with a three-kilogram warhead, is designated Izdeliye 52 and reportedly was upgraded with a larger warhead and a new EO guidance system as of March 2023.

Operators

See also
 AeroVironment Switchblade
 HESA Shahed 136

References

Loitering munition
Unmanned aerial vehicles of Russia
Military vehicles introduced in the 2010s